The 2009 76 Classic was a 3-day, 8-team, 12-game men’s National Collegiate Athletic Association (NCAA) Division I exempt basketball event held on November 26, 27, & 29, 2009 during the 2009-10 NCAA Division I men's basketball season.  The tournament was sponsored by ConocoPhillips-owned brand 76. All games were played at the Anaheim Convention Center in Anaheim, California. The 76 Classic was an ESPN Regional TV owned and operated event, hosted by ESPN and the Big West Conference. All games were televised on the ESPN family of networks.

Butler, with 6'9" Gordon Hayward, was rated No. 9 by ESPN The Magazine in its pre-season rankings, followed by No. 11 West Virginia, No. 23 Minnesota, No. 27 Texas A&M, and No. 30 UCLA.  West Virginia won the tournament by defeating Long Beach State, Texas A&M, and upstart Portland in the finals to capture the 76 Classic title in 2009.

Bracket 
* – Denotes overtime period

Awards and honors
Tournament MVP
 DaSean Butler, West Virginia

All-Tournament Team
 DaSean Butler, West Virginia
 T.J. Campbell, Portland
 T.J. Robinson, Long Beach State
 Gordon Hayward, Butler

See also 
76 Classic

References

76 Classic
76 Classic
College basketball tournaments in California
Basketball competitions in Anaheim, California